Krissy Kneen is a Brisbane-based bookseller and writer. Kneen has been shortlisted three times for the Queensland Premier's Literary Award, and in 2014 won the Thomas Shapcott Poetry Prize.

She is the author of a short collection of erotica, Swallow the Sound, and a memoir, Affection. Kneen has also penned a collection of erotica entitled Triptych. Her first novel, Steeplechase, was published in 2013. Her work is described as "Transgressive, sardonic, lyrical, comic; irresistibly erotic yet also romantic, Krissy Kneen's writing has been acclaimed for its fearless honesty. In this suite of linked stories, she addresses taboos of all kinds with a subtle wit and an insistence on sexual pleasure that will delight readers"

She is founding member of Eatbooks Inc and is the marketing and promotions officer at Avid Reader bookshop. She lives in New Farm, Brisbane, with her husband and no pets.

She appeared in 4 events at the 2017 Brisbane Writers Festival in Brisbane, Queensland, Australia.

Published works

Novels 
 Swallow the Sound, Eatbooks, 2007, 
 Affection: A Memoir of Love, Sex & Intimacy, Text Publishing, 2009, 
 Triptych, An Erotic Adventure: 3 Stories in 1, Text Publishing, 2011, 
 Steeplechase, Text Publishing, 2013, 
 The Adventures of Holly White and the Incredible Sex Machine, Text Publishing, 2015, 
 An Uncertain Grace, Text Publishing, 2017, 
 Wintering, Text Publishing, 2018,

Poetry
 Eating My Grandmother: A Grief Cycle, University of Queensland Press, 2015,

Contributed chapter 
 "The university and the beast: a fairy tale", pp. 263–276, in: Destroying the Joint, edited by Jane Caro, Read How You Want, 2015,

Awards and nominations

Australian Book Industry Awards 

 2010: Shortlist: Affection

Queensland Premier's Literary Awards: Emerging Manuscript 

 2005: Shortlist: His Father's Son

Queensland Premier's Literary Awards: Emerging Queensland Author Manuscript Award 

 2007: Shortlist: Paper Dolls, Holding Hands

Queensland Premier's Literary Awards: Non-Fiction Book Award 

 2010: Shortlist: Affection

Stella Prize 

 2018: Shortlist: An Uncertain Grace.

Thomas Shapcott Poetry Prize 

 2014: Winner: Eating My Grandmother: A Grief Cycle

Queensland Literary Awards: Queensland Premier's Award for a work of State Significance 

 2019: Shortlist: Wintering

References

External links
 Krissy Kneen, Text Publishing 
 Krissy Kneen on Tumblr
Official web-site

1968 births
Living people
Women erotica writers
Writers from Brisbane
Australian memoirists
Australian booksellers
Australian women memoirists
Australian women poets